Cymbiola rossiniana is a species of sea snail, a marine gastropod mollusk in the family Volutidae, the volutes.

Description
C. rossiniana has a body length up to 124.5 mm.

Distribution

References

External links

Volutidae
Gastropods described in 1859